Ordoño I ( – 27 May 866) was King of Asturias from 850 until his death.

He was born in Oviedo, where he spent his early life in the court of Alfonso II. He was probably associated with the crown from an early age. He was probably raised in Lugo, capital of the province of Galicia, of which his father, Ramiro, had been named governor. There he was educated, including in the military arts.

Ordoño was named governor of Galicia when his father went to Vardulia to marry Paterna (his second wife). Whilst away, Alfonso died, and the nobles elected Count Nepocian as king.  Ordoño immediately began to raise an army to assist his father in claiming the throne. He could not leave his post in Galicia to help, however, and his army went unused. When his father finally prevailed, he confirmed Ordoño in his heretofore provisional position.

On February 1, 850, Ordoño succeeded his father as king. As he was his father's heir, he was the first king of Asturias to ascend the throne without election. His first confrontation was with the Basques, who rebelled with the support of the Banu Qasi of Zaragoza. While returning to Oviedo after defeating the rebels, he received news of an impending Moorish assault on Vardulias. Before the Moors could attack, he met them near the Ebro and defeated them. These victories meant little in the long run, for the governor of Zaragoza, Musa ibn Musa, fortified the city of Albaida (Albelda). In 859, Ordoño defeated him at Albelda and besieged and razed the city.

He supported the mozarab rebels, which cost him at Guadacelete in 854, but this fiasco only incited him to consolidate the "Desert of the Duero", the depopulated region between the Asturian cordillera and the river Duero. He directed the repoblación of the towns of León and Talamanca, Astorga, Tui, and Amaya.

He intended to advance against the governor of Tudela and thus control all access to the Navarre and the Basque Country, but the Emirate of Córdoba responded with the invasion and sacking of Álava. At Bureba, the Arabs defeated Rodrigo, first count of Castile, and set back the Reconquista for years.

Ordoño married Muniadona. He had six children, including his successor, Alfonso III.

Ordoño died in Oviedo and was succeeded by his eldest son.

References

820s births
866 deaths
Beni Alfons
People from Oviedo
9th-century Asturian monarchs
Year of birth uncertain